Conasprella aturensis is a species of sea snail, a marine gastropod mollusk in the family Conidae, the cone snails and their allies.

Distribution
This species occurs in the following locations:France

References

 Lozouet P. (2017). Les Conoidea de l'Oligocène supérieur (Chattien) du bassin de l'Adour (Sud-Ouest de la France). Cossmanniana. 19: 3–180.

External links
 

aturensis
Gastropods described in 1931